Fool Me Once may refer to:

Film and television
 "Fool Me Once..." (Castle), a 2009 television episode
 "Fool Me Once" (Escape Club), a 2014 television episode
 "Fool Me Once..." (Jungle Cubs), a 1996 television episode
 "Fool Me Once" (Orange Is the New Black), a 2013 television episode
 "Fool Me Once" (The Vampire Diaries), a 2010 television episode
 Fool Me Once, a 2006 short film featuring Sharon Lawrence

Literature
 Fool Me Once, a 2016 novel by Harlan Coben
 Fool Me Once, a 2005 novel by T. Lynn Ocean
 Fool Me Once, a 2011 nonfiction book by Rick Lax

Songs
 "Fool Me Once", by B.B. King from There Is Always One More Time, 1991
 "Fool Me Once", by Bride from Silence Is Madness, 1989
 "Fool Me Once", by Burden of a Day from OneOneThousand, 2009
 "Fool Me Once", by Connie Hall, 1963
 "Fool Me Once", by Lindsey Webster, 2016
 "Fool Me Once", by One-Eyed Doll from Dirty, 2012